Dayton Historic District is a national historic district located at Dayton, Indiana, Tippecanoe County, Indiana.  The district encompasses 82 contributing buildings and 1 contributing site in the central business district and surrounding residential sections of Dayton.  It developed between about 1830 and 1952 and includes representative examples of Greek Revival, Italianate, Second Empire, and Bungalow / American Craftsman style architecture.  Notable contributing resources include the Lantz Building (1941), Reincke-Hawkins House (c. 1860), Castle Block (1894), Baker-Yost House (c. 1847), First Presbyterian Church (1899), and Gladden-Goldsbury House (c. 1878).

It was listed on the National Register of Historic Places in 2003.

References

External links

Historic districts on the National Register of Historic Places in Indiana
Greek Revival architecture in Indiana
Italianate architecture in Indiana
Second Empire architecture in Indiana
Bungalow architecture in Indiana
Historic districts in Tippecanoe County, Indiana
National Register of Historic Places in Tippecanoe County, Indiana